Ahmed Nasser Al-Bahri (born 18 September 1980) is a Saudi Arabian former footballer. He also holds Emirati citizenship.

Club career
At the club level, he last played as a defender for Al-Ittifaq.

International career
Al-Bahri is also a member of the Saudi Arabia national team. He appeared for his country in the 2003 Arab Cup and was a member of the Saudi team at the FIFA World Youth Championship. He was called up to the squad for the 2006 FIFA World Cup.

Honours

International
Saudi Arabia
Islamic Solidarity Games: 2005

References

External links
 

Al Nassr FC players
1980 births
Living people
Saudi Arabian footballers
2006 FIFA World Cup players
2007 AFC Asian Cup players
Saudi Arabia international footballers
Association football defenders
Ettifaq FC players
Al-Shabab FC (Riyadh) players
Al-Faisaly FC players
Sportspeople from Riyadh
Saudi Professional League players